The Mercedes D.IVa was a German six-cylinder, water-cooled, inline engine developed in 1917 for use in aircraft and built by Daimler Motoren Gesellschaft (DMG).

Design and development
The D.IVa replaced the failed Mercedes D.IV inline eight-cylinder engine. The D.IVa was primarily used to power bombers and large reconnaissance aircraft. Unlike most German designs, the D.IVa was relatively advanced, including four valves per cylinder powered by a SOHC valvetrain, the same "single-camshaft" arrangement that had also been used on the earlier two-valve per cylinder D.I through D.IIIa powerplants.

Designed specifically to be installed in the fuselage, the engine featured a number of design elements intended to reduce its width. For instance, the carburetor was placed behind the engine, feeding fuel to the cylinders via a long tubular intake manifold. This had the disadvantage of poor fuel distribution. Two versions of the engine were produced in mirror copies, running in opposite directions.

Applications

 AEG G.IV
 AEG G.V
 AEG R.I
 AGO C.VIII
 Albatros C.X
 Albatros C.XII
 Albatros C.XV
 Friedrichshafen G.III
 Friedrichshafen G.IV
 Friedrichshafen N.I
 Gotha G.III
 Gotha G.IV
 Gotha G.V
 Gotha G.VI
 Gotha G.VII
 Linke-Hofmann R.I
 Linke-Hofmann R.II
 Rumpler C.IV
 Zeppelin Staaken R.VI

Engines on display
A Mercedes D.IVa recently restored by the Museum's Friends ASSN. is on public display at the Museo Nacional de Aeronautica  (MORON-Argentina).

Specifications (D.IVa)

See also

References

Notes

Bibliography
Gunston, Bill. World Encyclopedia of Aero Engines. Cambridge, England. Patrick Stephens Limited, 1989. 
Jane's Fighting Aircraft of World War I. London. Studio Editions Ltd, 1993.

Further reading

External links

Tests of the Daimler D-IVa engine at a high altitude test bench (October 1, 1920)

Mercedes aircraft engines
1910s aircraft piston engines